Book of Silk is the fourth album of Tin Hat Trio. It is a modern chamber music work, encompassing jazz in the Django and Grappelli vein with a haunting, acoustic soundscape that might have served as a film score.

Reception 

Reviews were uniformly positive, with critics noting the more introspective and entirely instrumental turn (save for the closing lullaby).

Track listing
"The Longest Night" – 3:54 (Orton)
"The Clandestine Adventures of Ms. Merz" – 2:20 (Burger)
"Compay" – 4:52 (Kihlstedt)
"Invisible Mobile " – 4:45 (Orton)
"March of the Smallest Feet" (Kihlstedt) – 3:58 (Kihlstedt)
"Hotel Aurora" – 3:38 (Orton)
"Osborne Avenue" – 3:34 (Burger)
"Elliott Carter Family" – 3:52 (Parkins / Tin Hat Trio)
"Things That Might Have Been" – 4:26 (Burger)
"Red Hook Stoop" – 4:48 (Burger)
"Same Shirt, Different Day" – 1:55 (Burger)
"Pablo Looks Back" – 1:09 (Kihlstedt)
"Light Black from Pole to Pole" – 2:49 (Kihlstedt)
"Lauren's Lullaby" – 4:12 (Orton)
"Empire of Light" – 2:59 (Orton / Coykedndall, arr. Orton)

Personnel
 Mark Orton – guitar, banjo, dobro
 Carla Kihlstedt – violin, viola, voice
 Rob Burger – accordion, piano, prepared piano, toy piano, field organ, celeste
 Bryan Smith – tuba, euphonium
 Zeena Parkins – harp

Song use 
"March of the Smallest Feet" appeared on the documentary A Fierce Green Fire (2012).

References

2004 albums
Ropeadope Records albums